Discovery World is a former European pay television channel which featured programming in the fields of travel, culture and history. It used to be a pan-European television channel. Discovery World offered a mix of history, culture, real-life stories, investigation, mystery shows, factual series and documentaries. At time of closure its programming was mainly in English and subtitled in Dutch.

History
In Europe the channel started as Discovery Civilisation, also called Discovery Civilisation Channel, in the UK the 1 October 1998, alongside the Sky Digital's launch and later followed by other European countries. Discovery Civilisation focused on history-related programmes. On 1 November 2007, it was re-branded as Discovery Knowledge in the UK. On 18 April 2008 Discovery Civilisation changed its name into Discovery World across Europe and extended its programme lineup to also include programmes about culture, crime and "mysterious phenomena".

In 2013, the channel got replaced by Discovery Turbo Xtra in Central and Eastern Europe. On 31 March 2016, the channel got replaced by Discovery Family in Africa and the Middle East. The network has closed down in Italy, Portugal and Scandinavia.

Discovery World, along with Fine Living closed on 31 December 2020, when it last aired in the Netherlands and Belgium.

See also
 Discovery World HD

References

Warner Bros. Discovery networks
Defunct television channels in Belgium
Television channels in Flanders
Defunct television channels in the Netherlands
Television channels and stations established in 1998
Television channels and stations disestablished in 2020
Warner Bros. Discovery EMEA